Laviano is a town and comune in the province of Salerno in the Campania region of south-western Italy. The commune has a population of 1,409.

External links

References 

Cities and towns in Campania
Localities of Cilento